Mooliabeenee (also found misspelt as Mooliabeenie) is a locality in Western Australia, east of Gingin, within the Shire of Chittering.

The nearby Mooliabeenie station lies on the Millendon Junction (near Midland) to Dongara section of the railway line now managed by Arc Infrastructure. It was originally built in 1894 as part of the Midland Railway.

Like the Caversham Airfield, the Mooliabeenee Airfield was later used as a motor racing track. Local car clubs regularly use the site for motorkhana events.

See also
 List of airports in Victoria
 Aviation transport in Australia

References

Notes

External links 
Gazetteer of Australia

Towns in Western Australia
Defunct airports in Western Australia